Mohieddine Beni Daoud (born 20 April 1976) is a Tunisian racewalker. He competed in the men's 20 kilometres walk at the 1996 Summer Olympics.

References

1976 births
Living people
Athletes (track and field) at the 1996 Summer Olympics
Tunisian male racewalkers
Olympic athletes of Tunisia
Place of birth missing (living people)
20th-century Tunisian people